Hylarana tytleri is a frog species in the family Ranidae. It is found in eastern and northeastern India, Bangladesh, and southern Nepal, and possibly at lower elevations in Bhutan. It was formerly placed in Rana, and included in the common green frog (H. erythraea). It is probably a close relative of that species nonetheless, and thus placed in the revalidated genus Hylarana, of which H. erythraea is the type species. Common name Theobald's ranid frog has been coined for it, although common names for Indian frogs previously identified as Rana erythraea include yellow-striped frog, leaf  frog, and leaping frog.

Description
The head is moderately elongated. The shanks are relatively long (about 55% of SVL). Webbing is partial. The body is uniformly greenish with two whitish or yellow lines laterally on back. There are two distinct brown lines on inner side of latero-dorsal folds. No mid-dorsal line is present.

Habitat and conservation
It may venture into bank side vegetation and into scrubland and tropical forest habitats. It is a common species, but water pollution with agrochemicals can be a threat. It may also suffer locally from over-collection for food. It is not considered a threatened species by the IUCN.

References

tytleri
Frogs of Bangladesh
Frogs of India
Amphibians of Nepal
Taxa named by William Theobald
Amphibians described in 1868
Taxonomy articles created by Polbot